Moji Olaiya  (27 February 1975 – 17 May 2017) was a Nigerian actress.

Career
The daughter of highlife musician Victor Olaiya, Moji Olaiya began her acting career with Wale Adenuga's production Super Story. She starred in several Nollywood movies of Yoruba and English genres. She was known for her roles in films such as No Pains No Gains, in which she played Ireti, Sade Blade (2005), Nkan adun (2008) and Omo iya meta leyi (2009). She also starred in the Agunbaniro. In 2003 she was nominated for the Reel Award Best Supporting Actress of the Year, and she won the Best New Actress Award.

In 2016, Olaiya released a film, Iya Okomi, starring Foluke Daramola and Funsho Adeolu, which was scheduled to premiere in Lagos on July.

Personal life
Olaiya married Bayo Okesola in 2007, then separated. She converted to Islam in 2014.

Olaiya died on 17 May 2017, from cardiac arrest in Canada, where she had her second child exactly two months prior. She was finally laid to rest on 7 June 2017 according to Islamic rites.

Selected filmography
 Aje nile Olokun
 Ojiji Aye
 Apaadi
 Omo Iya Meta leyi (2009)
 Nkan adun (2008)
 Sade Blade (2005)

See also
List of Yoruba people
List of Nigerian actors

References

External links

1975 births
2017 deaths
Actresses in Yoruba cinema
Converts to Islam
Deaths in childbirth
Nigerian film actresses
Nigerian Muslims
Nigerian television actresses
Yoruba actresses
21st-century Nigerian actresses
Deaths in Canada